Rajya Sabha elections were held on various dates in 2010, to elect members of the Rajya Sabha, Indian Parliament's upper chamber. The elections were held  to elect respectively 13 members from 6 states, 49 members from 12 states, six members from Andhra Pradesh and two members from Haryana for the Council of States, the Rajya Sabha.

Elections
Elections were held to elect members from various states.

Members elected
The following members are elected in the elections held in 2010.
The list is incomplete.

State - Member - Party

Bye-elections
The bye-elections were also held for the vacant seats from the State of Gujarat, Rajashthan, Uttar Pradesh.

 Bye-elections were held on 25 February  2010 for vacancy from Gujarat due to death of seating member Suryakantbhai  Acharya on 21/04/2010 with term ending on 18/08/2011. Pravin Naik of BJP got elected.

 Bye-elections were held on 17 June 2010 for vacancy from Rajasthan due to death of seating member Krishan Lal Balmiki of BJP on 21/04/2010 with term ending on 02/04/2012. Narendra Budania of INC became the member.

 Bye-elections were held on 15 July 2010 for vacancy from Uttar Pradesh due to death of seating member Virendra Bhatia of SP on 21/04/2010 with term ending on 02/04/2012. Pramod Kureel of BSP became the member.

References

2010 elections in India
2010